Robert Patterson Kennedy (January 23, 1840 – May 6, 1918) was a U.S. representative from Ohio, as well as an officer in the Union Army during the American Civil War.

Biography
Born in Bellefontaine, Ohio, Kennedy attended the public schools and Geneva College in Northwood, Ohio. He was studying at Yale University when the American Civil War broke out.

Military career
He was commissioned as a second lieutenant in the 23rd Ohio Infantry on June 11, 1861. He served as a captain and assistant adjutant general dating from October 7, 1862, and was promoted to major and assistant adjutant general on November 16, 1864. He resigned April 8, 1865. Kennedy was commissioned as colonel of the 196th Ohio Infantry, on April 14, 1865. He was brevetted as lieutenant colonel of volunteers and brigadier general of volunteers, both dating from March 13, 1865.

Political career
Upon the end of the war and his resignation from the volunteer army, Kennedy returned to Bellefontaine. He studied law with judge William H. West. He was admitted to the bar in 1866 and commenced practice in Bellefontaine. He was appointed by President Rutherford B. Hayes as collector of internal revenue for the fourth district of Ohio, serving from 1878 to 1883. He was the lieutenant governor of Ohio from 1885–87. Kennedy was elected from Ohio's 8th District as a Republican to the Fiftieth and Fifty-first Congresses (March 4, 1887 – March 4, 1891). He was not a candidate for renomination in 1890.He was appointed by President William McKinley in 1899 as a member of the Insular Commission, which was directed to investigate and report upon conditions existing in Cuba and Puerto Rico and served as its president.

Death and legacy
Robert P. Kennedy died in Columbus, Ohio.  Kennedy was a member of the Grand Army of the Republic, a Scottish Rite Freemason,  and member of the Presbyterian Church. He was married on December 29, 1862 at Bellefontaine to Maria Lewis Gardner of that city. She died in 1893, leaving four children. He married at Wabash, Indiana to Emma (Cowgill) Mendenhall of that city on September 4, 1894. She survived him.

Despite his name and profession, he was not related to the Kennedy political family.

Kennedy was the author of The Historical Review of Logan County, Ohio, published in 1903 by The S. J. Clarke Publishing Co., Chicago.

Further reading

References

External links

 

Lieutenant Governors of Ohio
1840 births
1918 deaths
People of Ohio in the American Civil War
People from Bellefontaine, Ohio
Geneva College alumni
Yale University alumni
Ohio lawyers
Union Army colonels
American militia generals
19th-century American politicians
19th-century American lawyers
Republican Party members of the United States House of Representatives from Ohio